Romain Bogaerts (born 23 December 1993) is a Belgian tennis player.

Bogaerts has a career high ATP singles ranking of 1092 achieved on 12 August 2013. He also has a career high ATP doubles ranking of 879 achieved on 10 November 2014.

Bogaerts made his ATP main draw debut at the 2013 Winston-Salem Open in the singles draw facing Lu Yen-hsun. Bogaerts also played college tennis at Wake Forest University.

References

External links

1993 births
Living people
Belgian male tennis players
People from Ramillies, Belgium
Sportspeople from Namur (city)
Wake Forest Demon Deacons men's tennis players
21st-century Belgian people